Ahmed Mohammed Saleh Amien (born 23 January 2001), commonly known as Ahmed Saleh, is a Saudi Arabian professional footballer who plays as a midfielder for Ohod.

References

External links
 

2001 births
Living people
Saudi Arabian footballers
Saudi Professional League players
Saudi First Division League players
Saudi Second Division players
Ohod Club players
Al-Dahab Club players
Association football midfielders